(), formerly Rhythm Watch until 2020) is a Japanese global corporate group based in Saitama, Japan. The company was founded in 1950. It is well known globally as a manufacturer of watches, clocks, precision equipment, connectors and small displays. From 1955 until 2003 it was headquartered in Tokyo.

See also
 Seiko
 Citizen Watch
 Orient

References

External links
 Rhythm Watch Co., Ltd. (official website)
 Rhythm Watch Co., Ltd. Official YouTube channel

Manufacturing companies established in 1950
Japanese companies established in 1950
Multinational companies headquartered in Japan
Manufacturing companies based in Tokyo
Watch brands
Watchmaking conglomerates
Electronics companies of Japan
Watch manufacturing companies of Japan
Companies based in Saitama Prefecture
Companies listed on the Tokyo Stock Exchange
Japanese brands
Nishitōkyō, Tokyo